Gollabhama sari also Siddipet Gollabhama are saris made in Siddipet, Telangana, India. These cotton saris are popular for their inlay figure work and motifs.

Geographical indication rights
The sari received  Intellectual Property Rights Protection or Geographical Indication (GI) status.

References

Saris
Medak district
Culture of Telangana
Geographical indications in Telangana
Siddipet